is a double A-side single by Japanese pop group AAA. It was released on May 5, 2010, via Avex Trax. The former was written by Kyasu Morizuki and the latter was written by Kenn Kato. Both songs were composed and produced by Tetsuya Komuro. The single debuted at number-one on the Oricon Weekly Chart becoming their second number-one single and Komuro's forty-third. "Aitai Riyū" was one of 10 songs awarded a Japan Record Award in 2010.

Background
During August 2009 Tetsuya Komuro had composed about 60 demo songs. He was asked by Avex to work with AAA to which he agreed and chose two of the demos that he felt fitted the group perfectly. Recording for the single took place during January 2010. "Aitai Riyū" was written by Kyasu Morizuki, which has been described as mid-tempo ballad; while "Dream After Dream (Yume Kara Sameta Yume)" was written by Kenn Kato and was described as a dance-pop number. This is his comeback to the music scene since he was arrested two years ago for fraud.

Packaging
The single is released in four formats; the regular CD version and two CD+DVD versions. The CD version contains remixes and instrumentals of both songs with "Dream After Dream (Yume Kara Sameta Yume)" placed as track number-one and the title of the cover art is changed to reflect that. CD+DVD version A comes with both songs, instrumentals, a DVD and the title of the cover art reflects that of the actual title of the single. CD+DVD version B contains the same contents as version A, however; like the CD version "Dream After Dream (Yume Kara Sameta Yume)" is track number-one and the cover art is changed to reflect it. The fourth version is a Mu-mo exclusive version that contains posters.

Chart performance
On the Billboard Japan Hot 100 chart, Aiati Riyū debuted at number 58, issue date May 10, 2010. The following week, issue date May 17, 2010, the song moved up on the chart peaking at No. 13. The other A-side, "Dream After Dream (Yume Kara Sameta Yume)" debuted at number 26.

Live performances
AAA appeared on May 9, 2010, episode of Music Japan, where they performed "Aitai Riyū". They appeared on Music Station on May 14, 2010, and performed "AItai Riyū". AAA performed both songs on their AAA Heart to Heart Tour 2010, with Komuro playing the piano during "Aitai Riyū".

Track listing
Confirmed by Avex Trax.

Charts and certifications

Charts

Release history

References

External links
  Avex channel
  Avex channel

2010 singles
AAA (band) songs
Japanese-language songs
Oricon Weekly number-one singles
Song recordings produced by Tetsuya Komuro
Songs written by Tetsuya Komuro